Church Avenue Line may refer to the following transit lines in Brooklyn, New York:
Church Avenue Line (surface) (bus, formerly streetcar), a public transit line running mainly along 39th Street and Church Avenue between Sunset Park and Brownsville
Church Avenue Line, one of several names for IND Church Avenue Line's subway portion, running south from Jay Street to Church Avenue